Alexeyevsky (masculine), Alexeyevskaya (feminine), or Alexeyevskoye (neuter) may refer to:
Alexeyevsky District, several districts in Russia
Alexeyevskoye Urban Settlement, several municipal urban settlements in Russia
Alexeyevsky (inhabited locality) (Alexeyevskaya, Alexeyevskoye), several inhabited localities in Russia
Alexeyevskaya (Moscow Metro), a station of the Moscow Metro, Moscow, Russia

See also
Alexey
Alexeyev
Alexeyevka (disambiguation)